Brianne Alexandra Jenner (born May 4, 1991) is a Canadian professional ice hockey player and a member of Canada's national women's hockey team, currently affiliated with the Toronto chapter of the Professional Women's Hockey Players Association (PWHPA). She made her debut for Canada at the 2010 Four Nations Cup and won a gold medal. She was also a member of the Cornell Big Red women's ice hockey program.

Playing career
In high school, Jenner was the Appleby College hockey team captain. Jenner played junior hockey in the Provincial Women's Hockey League (PWHL) with the Stoney Creek Sabres. She was also the captain of Team Ontario Red at the 2008 National Women's Under-18 Championship. She scored the game-winning goal in double overtime of the gold medal game.

Cornell
On October 29 and 30, 2010, Jenner played a role in both victories for the Cornell Big Red ice hockey team. On October 29, she had three assists at Quinnipiac. The following day, she scored a pair of goals and added an assist at Princeton.

During three games from February 7 to February 11, 2012, Jenner led her team with eight points. Versus nationally ranked Mercyhurst, Jenner had a goal and an assist in a February 7 victory over Mercyhurst. In a 5–0 shutout win over the Brown Bears (on February 10), Jenner garnered two assists from two goals. On February 11, Jenner scored the game-winning goal versus the Yale Bulldogs that clinched the ECAC Hockey regular-season championship. In addition, she scored another goal, earning her 30th assist of the season.

CWHL
Before she went to college, she played with the Mississauga Chiefs during the 2008–09 Canadian Women's Hockey League season. The following season, she joined the Burlington Barracudas and then left for Cornell in 2010.

On June 6, 2015, Jenner announced her entry into the 2015 CWHL Draft with the hopes of being selected by the Calgary Inferno as she would also be studying for a master's degree in public policy at the University of Calgary and would play alongside three or more Cornell Big Red graduates.

Jenner helped the Inferno capture their first Clarkson Cup championship in 2016. Contested at Ottawa's Canadian Tire Centre, she scored twice in an 8–3 victory over Les Canadiennes de Montreal. She remained with the Inferno until the league ceased operations following the 2018–19 CWHL season.

PWHPA
Skating for Team Sonnet (Toronto), Jenner participated in the 2021 Secret Cup, which was the Canadian leg of the 2020–21 PWHPA Dream Gap Tour. In a 4-2 championship game loss versus Team Bauer (Montreal), she recorded a goal versus Ann-Renee Desbiens.

International play 

Jenner was named to the 2014 Olympic roster for Canada.
In a January 9, 2008, contest versus Germany (at the inaugural World Women's Under-18 hockey championship), Jenner scored twice and earned an assist in a 10–1 win. On November 27, 2009, Jenner and defender Jocelyne Larocque were released from Hockey Canada's centralized roster to determine the final roster for the 2010 Vancouver Winter Games. In March 2011, she was invited to the Canadian national women's ice hockey team selection camp to determine the final roster for the 2011 IIHF Women's World Championships.

On January 11, 2022, Jenner was named to Canada's 2022 Olympic team. Brianne Jenner's 9 goals in the tournament tied the Olympic record for most goals in a single women's tournament (9), capping off a tournament MVP nod and her 2nd Olympic gold medal.

Personal life
In July 2019, Jenner married her longtime partner Hayleigh Cudmore, a former teammate with the Cornell Big Red and the Calgary Inferno.

Career Statistics

Regular season and playoffs

International

Awards and honours
Toronto Star High School Athlete of the Week (Week of December 5, 2007)
Province of Ontario ribbon dancing quarterfinalist 2002–2003
Quill and Dagger Senior Honor Society, Cornell University

NCAA
ECAC women's ice hockey MLX Skates Rookie of the Week (Week of November 2, 2010)
2011 Patty Kazmaier Award Nominee
2010–11 Ivy League Rookie of the Year
2010–11 First Team All-Ivy
ECAC women's ice hockey Player of the Week (Week of October 31, 2011)
ECAC Player of the Week (Week of February 13, 2012)
2015 CCM Hockey Women's Division I All-Americans, Second Team

IIHF and Olympics 

 IIHF Women's World Hockey Championship gold medalist (2012, 2021, 2022), silver medallist (2013, 2015, 2016, 2017) and bronze medalist (2019)
 Olympic gold medalist (2014, 2022) and silver medalist (2018)
 Olympic tournament MVP (2022)

References

External links

1991 births
Living people
Burlington Barracudas players
Calgary Inferno players
Canadian expatriate ice hockey players in the United States
Canadian women's ice hockey forwards
Clarkson Cup champions
Cornell Big Red women's ice hockey players
Ice hockey people from Ontario
Ice hockey players at the 2014 Winter Olympics
Ice hockey players at the 2018 Winter Olympics
Ice hockey players at the 2022 Winter Olympics
Lesbian sportswomen
Canadian LGBT sportspeople
LGBT ice hockey players
Medalists at the 2014 Winter Olympics
Medalists at the 2018 Winter Olympics
Medalists at the 2022 Winter Olympics
Mississauga Chiefs players
Olympic gold medalists for Canada
Olympic ice hockey players of Canada
Olympic medalists in ice hockey
Olympic silver medalists for Canada
Professional Women's Hockey Players Association players
Sportspeople from Oakville, Ontario
21st-century Canadian LGBT people